Fe Villanueva del Mundo, (born Fé Primitiva del Mundo y Villanueva; 27 November 1911 – 6 August 2011) was a Filipina pediatrician. She founded the first pediatric hospital in the Philippines and is known for shaping the modern child healthcare system in the Philippines. Her pioneering work in pediatrics in the Philippines while in active medical practice spanned eight decades. She gained international recognition, including the Ramon Magsaysay Award for Public Service in 1977. In 1980, she was conferred the rank and title of National Scientist of the Philippines, and in 2010, she was conferred the Order of Lakandula. She was the first female president of the Philippine Pediatric Society and the first woman to be named National Scientist of the Philippines in 1980. She was also the founder and the first president of the Philippine Pediatric Society, the first Asian to be elected president of the Philippine Medical Association in its 65-years existence, and the first Asian to be voted president of the Medical Woman's International Association.

Early life and education
Del Mundo was born at 120 Cabildo Street in the district of Intramuros, Manila, on November 27, 1911. She was one of eight children of Bernardo del Mundo and Paz (née Villanueva; d. 1925). Her family home was opposite the Manila Cathedral. Bernardo was a prominent lawyer from Marinduque who served one term in the Philippine Assembly representing the province of Tayabas. Three of her eight siblings died in infancy, while an older sister died from appendicitis at age 11. The death of her younger sister Elisa, who had made known her desire to become a doctor for the poor, inspired del Mundo to choose a career in medicine.

In 1926, del Mundo enrolled at the UP College of Medicine, at the original campus of the University of the Philippines in Manila. She earned her medical degree in 1933, graduating as class valedictorian. She passed the medical board exam that same year, placing third among the examinees. Her exposure while in medical school to various health conditions afflicting children in the provinces, particularly in Marinduque, led her to choose pediatrics as her specialization.

Postgraduate studies

After del Mundo graduated from UPM, President Manuel Quezon offered to pay for her further training, in a medical field of her choice, at any school in the United States.
Del Mundo has sometimes been said to have been Harvard Medical School's first woman student, the first woman enrolled in pediatrics at the school, or its first Asian student.
However, according to an archivist at Harvard's Center for the History of Medicine, 

Harvard had had thousands of Asian students by the time Del Mundo arrived there.

Del Mundo returned to Harvard Medical School's Children's Hospital in 1939 for a two-year research fellowship. She also enrolled at the Boston University School of Medicine, earning a Master's degree in bacteriology in 1940.

Medical practice
Del Mundo returned to the Philippines in 1941, shortly before the Japanese invasion of the country. She joined the International Red Cross and volunteered to care for child-internees then detained at the University of Santo Tomas internment camp for foreign nationals. She set up a makeshift hospice within the internment camp, and her activities led her to be known as "The Angel of Santo Tomas". After the Japanese authorities shut down the hospice in 1943, del Mundo was asked by Manila mayor León Guinto to head a children's hospital under the auspices of the city government. The hospital was later converted into a full-care medical center to cope with the mounting casualties during the Battle of Manila, and would be renamed the North General Hospital (later, the Jose R. Reyes Memorial Medical Center). Del Mundo would remain the hospital's director until 1948.

Del Mundo joined the faculty of the University of Santo Tomas, then the Far Eastern University in 1954. She became the head of the Department of Pediatrics at Far Eastern University - Nicanor Reyes Medical Foundation for more than two decades. During this time, she founded the Children's Medical Center Foundation in 1957. She also established a small medical pediatric clinic to pursue a private practice and established the Institute of Maternal and Child Health, an institution that trains doctors and nurses.

Establishment of the Children's Medical Center

Frustrated by the bureaucratic constraints in working for a government hospital, del Mundo desired to establish her own pediatric hospital. Towards that end, she sold her home and most of her personal effects, and obtained a sizable loan from the GSIS (the Government Service Insurance System) in order to finance the construction of her own hospital. The Children's Medical Center, a 107-bed hospital located in Quezon City, was inaugurated in 1957 as the first pediatric hospital in the Philippines. The hospital was expanded in 1966 through the establishment of an Institute of Maternal and Child Health, the first institution of its kind in Asia.

In 1958, del Mundo conveyed her personal ownership of the hospital to a board of trustees.

Dr. Fe del Mundo lived on the second floor of the Children's Medical Center in Quezon City and continued making early morning rounds until she was 99 years old.

Establishment of the Children's Medical Center Foundation 
When she founded the Children's Medical Center Foundation in 1957, she was able to bring medical care Filipinos in the rural areas of the Philippines who had little to no access to health care. This foundation saved thousands of children through establishment of family planning clinics and treatment of preventable health issues such as poor nutrition and dehydration.

Later life and death
Del Mundo was still active in her practice of pediatrics into her 90s. She died of cardiac arrest on August 6, 2011, and was buried at the Libingan ng mga Bayani.

Medicine in the Philippines was revolutionized by Dr. Fe del Mundo. She made numerous breakthroughs in the field of pediatrics from immunization, treatment of jaundice, and providing accessible health care to countless families living in poverty.

Research and innovations
Del Mundo was noted for her pioneering work on infectious diseases in Philippine communities. Undeterred by the lack of well-equipped laboratories in post-war Philippines, she unhesitatingly sent specimens or blood samples for analysis abroad. In the 1950s, she pursued studies on dengue fever, a common malady in the Philippines, of which little was known at the time. Her clinical observations on dengue, and the findings of research she later undertook on the disease are said to "have led to a fuller understanding of dengue fever as it afflicts the young". She authored over a hundred articles, reviews, and reports in medical journals on such diseases as dengue, polio and measles. She also authored Textbook of Pediatrics, a fundamental medical text used in Philippine medical schools.

Del Mundo was active in the field of public health, with special concerns towards rural communities. She organized rural extension teams to advise mothers on breastfeeding and child care. and promoted the idea of linking hospitals to the community through the public immersion of physicians and other medical personnel to allow for greater coordination among health workers and the public for common health programs such as immunization and nutrition. She called for the greater integration of midwives into the medical community, considering their more visible presence within rural communities. Notwithstanding her own devout Catholicism, she was an advocate of family planning and population control.

Del Mundo was also known for having devised an incubator made out of bamboo, designed for use in rural communities without electrical power.

Awards and recognition
In 1980, del Mundo was declared as a National Scientist of the Philippines, the first Filipino woman to be so named.

Among the international honors bestowed on del Mundo was the Elizabeth Blackwell Award for Outstanding Service to Mankind, handed in 1966 by Hobart and William Smith Colleges, and the citation as Outstanding Pediatrician and Humanitarian by the International Pediatric Association in 1977. Also in 1977, del Mundo was awarded the Ramon Magsaysay Award for Public Service.

Dr. Fe del Mundo was an honorary member of the American Pediatric Society and a consultant of the World Health Organization.

In 2008, she received the Blessed Teresa of Calcutta Award of the AY Foundation.

On April 22, 2010, President Gloria Macapagal-Arroyo awarded del Mundo the Order of Lakandula with the rank of Bayani at the Malacañan Palace.

Posthumously, she was conferred the Grand Collar of the Order of the Golden Heart Award by President Benigno Aquino III in 2011.

On November 27, 2018, a Google Doodle was displayed to celebrate del Mundo's 107th birthday.

References

Sources
 
 

 
 Fe Del Mundo Medical Center. Legacy & History https://www.fedelmundo.com.ph/history-legacy/

External links
 Citation for Fe Del Mundo, 1977 Ramon Magsaysay Award for Public Service
 Biography of Fe Del Mundo, 1977 Ramon Magsaysay Award for Public Service
 DOST – National Academy of Science and Technology: Fe Del Mundo

1911 births
2011 deaths
People from Intramuros
University of the Philippines Manila alumni
Filipino inventors
Filipino educators
Filipino pediatricians
Ramon Magsaysay Award winners
Grand Collars of the Order of the Golden Heart
Grand Crosses of the Order of Lakandula
National Scientists of the Philippines
Boston University School of Medicine alumni
Tagalog people
Burials at the Libingan ng mga Bayani
Filipino women medical doctors
20th-century Filipino medical doctors
21st-century Filipino medical doctors
20th-century American women physicians
20th-century American physicians
21st-century American women physicians
21st-century American physicians
Women inventors